Armula Peak is the ice-covered peak rising to 1142 m in the west foothills of Hemimont Plateau, Loubet Coast in Graham Land, Antarctica. The feature has steep and partly ice-free south slopes, and surmounts Klebelsberg Glacier to the south, and Finsterwalder Glacier to the north and northwest.

The peak is named after the ancient Thracian settlement of Armula in Western Bulgaria.

Location
British mapping in 1978.

Maps
Antarctic Digital Database (ADD). Scale 1:250000 topographic map of Antarctica. Scientific Committee on Antarctic Research (SCAR). Since 1993, regularly upgraded and updated.
British Antarctic Territory. Scale 1:200000 topographic map. DOS 610 Series, Sheet W 67 66. Directorate of Overseas Surveys, Tolworth, UK, 1978.

Notes

References
 Bulgarian Antarctic Gazetteer. Antarctic Place-names Commission. (details in Bulgarian, basic data in English)
Armula Peak. SCAR Composite Antarctic Gazetteer.

External links
 Armula Peak. Copernix satellite image

Mountains of Graham Land
Bulgaria and the Antarctic
Loubet Coast